Ernest Attah  was Military Governor of Cross River State, Nigeria, between December 1989 and January 1992 during the military regime of General Ibrahim Babangida.
When he assumed office he found so many problems with the state finances that he dissolved the entire state cabinet and set up two panels of inquiry headed by high court judges Emmanuel Effanga and Dorothy Nsa Eyamba-Idem to probe the administration of his predecessor Eben Ibim Princewill.

See also 
 Federal government of Nigeria
List of Governors of Cross River State

References

Nigerian military governors of Cross River State
Nigerian Army officers